Illinois Route 76 is a north–south state highway in far north-central Illinois. It runs from the US 20 Bus. in Belvidere north to the Wisconsin State Line at State Trunk Highway 140.

Route description 
Illinois 76 is an undivided two-lane rural highway for its entire length. Starting in US 20 Bus. in Belvidere, IL 76 travels north. It then intersects Illinois Route 173 near Poplar Grove. At the Wisconsin state line, IL 76 curves west. As soon as the road curves north, it enters Wisconsin. At that point, the road becomes WIS 140.

History 
Initially, only the section between IL 173 and US 20/IL 5 (now mostly US 20 Bus.) in downtown Belvidere was signed as IL 76. In 1935, IL 76 extended north to the state line. Also, IL 76 was slightly truncated due to the rerouting of US 20. Also, IL 5 then only appeared on the former stretch of US 20 from Rockford to Belvidere. Since 1967, part of IL 5 became part of US 20. Another truncation happened in Belvidere. Since 1989, US 20 Bus. bypassed downtown Belvidere. As a result, IL 76 no longer ended in downtown but instead ended north of downtown.

Major intersections

References

External links
 Illinois Highway Ends: Illinois Route 76

076
Transportation in Boone County, Illinois
Belvidere, Illinois